Pyongyang Marathon, also known as Mangyongdae Prize International Marathon, is an annual marathon race contested each April in Pyongyang, the capital of North Korea. It is categorised as an IAAF Bronze Label Road Race.

The marathon was held for the first time in 1981 for men, and the women's event was initiated in 1984. The 2009 race was the 22nd event. The competition was opened for international runners again in 2000. The race starts and finishes at the Rungnado May Day Stadium or Kim Il Sung Stadium and runs along the Taedong River. At the 2010 edition of the race, Ukrainian Ivan Babaryka became the first European runner to win in Pyongyang in 24 years. The race in 2012 was held as part of celebrations for the 100 years since Kim Il-sung's birth and featured one of the race's closest ever finishes: Oleksandr Matviychuk and Pak Song-chol were given identical times (2:12:54 hours), with the Ukrainian guest taking the title.

The 2015 marathon was initially closed to foreigners because of concerns about Ebola, but this decision has since been reversed after the reopening of the North Korean border in March 2015. The marathon was held in 2016, but did not meet IAAF specifications for an IAAF Bronze Label Road Race that it had on previous years. In 2020, it was announced that the marathon would be cancelled for that year due to the ongoing coronavirus outbreak in China. The 2021 edition was also cancelled due to the same reason as well as the 2022 edition.

Course records 

 Men: 2:10:50, Kim Jung-won, 1996
 Women: 2:26:02, Jong Yong-ok, 2007

List of winners 
Key:

See also

 Tourism in North Korea

References

External links

 
 Pyongyang Marathon at ARRS
 Pyongyang Marathon at Marathoninfo
 How to join Pyongyang Marathon

Sport in Pyongyang
Sports competitions in Pyongyang
Marathons in North Korea
Recurring sporting events established in 1981
Annual sporting events in North Korea
1981 establishments in North Korea
Spring (season) events in North Korea